Tenneti Park also known as (Vuda Tenneti Park) is an Urban park in the city of Visakhapatnam it is very beautiful ,it has very big waves ,A 3,000 -tonne Bangladeshi cargo vessel MV Maa drifted from the anchorage point and ran aground near Tenneti park in Visakhapatnam, India. Situated on the Beach Road in Jodugullapalem, it the first children's park, and one of the oldest parks in the city. It is located beside Sea Shore of Bay of Bengal. GVMC installed LED screens in the park to boost Tourism in the city.

This park was named after Tenneti Viswanadham

References

Parks in Visakhapatnam
Tourist attractions in Visakhapatnam
Uttarandhra